In mathematics, a Inoue–Hirzebruch surface is a complex surface with no meromorphic functions introduced by . They have Kodaira dimension κ = −∞, and are non-algebraic surfaces of class VII with positive second Betti number.  studied some higher-dimensional analogues.

See also
List of algebraic surfaces

References

Complex surfaces